Howell is a neighborhood of Evansville, Indiana, United States.

History
The town of Howell was platted in 1885 along the Louisville and Nashville Railroad and was named after Lee Howell, the local L&N freight agent. An L&N rail yard at Howell was completed in 1889. Most residents worked for the L&N. As of 1904, the town was a sundown town, where African Americans were not allowed to live. In 1915 or 1916, Evansville annexed Howell.

References

See also
 History of Evansville, Indiana

Geography of Evansville, Indiana
Sundown towns in Indiana
Former populated places in Indiana